Bolívar District is one of six districts in Bolívar Province in Peru. Its capital is the village of Bolívar

Districts of the La Libertad Region